Pauline May Harrison (née Cowan) (born 24 August 1926) is a British protein crystallographer and professor emeritus at the University of Sheffield. She gained her chemistry degree from Somerville College, Oxford in 1948, followed by a DPhil in X-ray crystallography in 1952 supervised by Dorothy Hodgkin. After 3 years at King's College London (contemporary with Rosalind Franklin) she moved to the University of Sheffield in 1955 as a demonstrator in the Biochemistry department (now Molecular Biology and Biotechnology), obtaining an MRC grant to study the iron storage protein Ferritin, publishing preliminary X-ray diffraction data in the 1st volume of the Journal of Molecular Biology in 1959. The molecule which became her life's work. In 1978, she was awarded a personal chair and retired in 1991. In 2001 she was appointed a CBE for services to higher education.

Personal life
Harrison is the daughter of botanists Adeline May Organe and John Macqueen Cowan, Assistant Keeper of the Royal Botanic Garden, Edinburgh. She was married to Royden Harrison, also a lecturer at Sheffield and a figure in the Labour movement until his death in 2002. Harrison is an alumna of St. Trinnean's School.

References

1926 births
Living people
Alumni of Somerville College, Oxford
British biochemists
British crystallographers
Academics of the University of Sheffield
English biophysicists
X-ray crystallography
British women biologists
British women chemists
20th-century British women scientists
20th-century British scientists
21st-century British women scientists
21st-century British scientists